An ethnic flag is a flag that symbolizes a certain ethnic group. Ethnic flags are often introduced to the ethnic community through the respective cultural or political ethnic movements.
They are popular among diasporas, ethnic minorities, and some ethnic majorities, especially in multiethnic countries.

History
Like the concept of a state's national flag itself, that of an "ethnic flag" is modern, 
first arising in the late 19th century; strictly speaking, the national flags of nation states are themselves "ethnic flags", and often so used by ethnic minorities in neighbouring states, especially in the context of irredentism (e.g. the flag of the Republic of Albania used as an "ethnic Albanian flag" by Kosovar Albanians).

Ethnic flags are often used in irredentism, representing the "national flag" of a proposed or unrecognized state. 
The first such flags were designed at the end of the 19th century, such as the Basque flag (1894) or the  "Flag of Zion" used to symbolize Zionism from 1898, which became the national flag of Israel 50 years later.

Most early ethnic flags imply a connection with an unrecognized state claimed by the respective ethnicities, such as the flag of Kurdistan which originates as the flag of the Republic of Ararat (1927).
A flag of the Hispanic People was designed in 1932.

Alternatively, an "ethnic flag" may represent a Pan-nationalism, such as the 
Pan-Arab flag which originates as the flag of the Arab Revolt during World War I, the proposed flag of Pan-Slavism (1848), Pan-Iranism or Pan-Turkism.

The concept of using ethnic flags to symbolize ethnic groups within a multiethnic state, not necessarily connected with irredentism, became popular in the later 20th century, such as the Australian Aboriginal flag (1971), the Assyrian flag (1971), the flag of the Romani people (1971), the Berber flag (1970s), the Sami flag (1986) or the national Māori flag (1990).
Designing ethnic or tribal flags has become very popular since the 1990s, especially for online use, and mostly do not have any kind of "official" status and must be judged based on de facto use. In many cases, the national flag of a sovereign state is often seen and used as a de facto ethnic flag by its people.

Individual flags

See also
 List of former sovereign states
 Flags of subnational entities
 Flags of unrecognized states
 Flags of micronations

References

 
 Flags of the World - FOTW

External links

 
Types of flags
Lists and galleries of flags